Maria Ferrari may refer to:

María Teresa Ferrari (1887–1956), Argentine educator, medical doctor, and women's rights activist 
María Paz Ferrari (born 1973) a field hockey player from Argentina
Nino Agostino Arturo Maria Ferrari, full name of Nino Ferrer (1934–1998), Italian-French singer, author and songwriter
Ines Maria Ferraris (1882–1971), Italian operatic soprano and pianist
Maria Teresa Ferrari de Miramar (also Sanchez), see Aleister Crowley

See also 

 Marina Ferrari (born 1973), French politician